Ngalula Fuamba (born 28 November 1994) is a Canadian rugby union player.

Fuamba competed for Canada at the delayed 2021 Rugby World Cup in New Zealand. She featured against the Eagles in the quarterfinals, and against England in the semifinal stage.

References 

Living people
1994 births
Female rugby union players
Canadian female rugby union players
Canada women's international rugby union players